WBYC-LP is a Variety formatted broadcast radio station licensed to Crisfield, Maryland, serving Crisfield and Hopewell in Maryland.  WBYC-LP is owned and operated by The Somerset County Arts Council.

References

External links
 107.3 WBYC Online
 

2016 establishments in Maryland
Variety radio stations in the United States
Radio stations established in 2016
BYC-LP
BYC-LP